Rock FM (previously Rock & Gol) is a Spanish radio station owned by Radio Popular S.A. (Cadena COPE).

Rock & Gol programs are centered on rock music of all times and soccer. It was until recently well known among young people for its two lead hosts Iván Guillén and Rafa Escalada and for beaming the best music of all times. Its present situation is based on previously programmed music and has lost all of its previous interaction.
In 2011 the radio station was renamed to Rock FM.

Programs and air staff 
Iván Guillén 'El Youngie' : No longer on air.
El Oldie y el youngie: No longer on air.
Rafael Escalada, 'El Oldie': Monday to Friday (11 am to 3 pm).
Iván Guillén 'El Youngie': No longer on air.
Rock & Gol Deportes: (Monday to Friday (8 pm to 8.30 pm))Sports news with Omar Candelas.

Little Steven's Underground Garage: (Fridays from 10 pm to 12 am)''
Program host by Steven Van Zandt guitarist of the Bruce Springsteen's E-Street Band.

External links 
 

Radio stations in Spain